George Edward Fox (born December 17, 1945) is an astrobiologist, a Professor Emeritus and researcher at the University of Houston. He is an elected fellow of the American Academy of Microbiology, the American Association for the Advancement of Science,  American Institute for Medical and Biological Engineering and the International Astrobiology Society. Fox received his B.A. degree in 1967, and completed his Ph.D. degree in 1974; both in chemical engineering at Syracuse University.

From the Fall of 1973 until 1977, Fox was a research associate with Carl R. Woese at the University of Illinois @ Urbana-Champaign. Their collaboration initially focused on 5S ribosomal RNA where they established the use of a comparative sequence approach to predict RNA secondary structure. Next, utilizing 16S ribosomal RNA finger printing technology developed in the Woese laboratory in large part by Mitchell Sogin, Fox and Woese discovered the third form of life now known as the Archaea.

It has been said that their 1977  paper “may be the most important paper ever in microbiology”. This seminal paper is now considered to be a PNAS classic. Fox and Woese also introduced the idea of a progenote as a primordial entity in the evolution of life.

In the Fall of 1977, Fox moved on to the University of Houston and as a new Assistant Professor in Biochemical & Biophysical Sciences, continued to collaborate with Woese. This resulted in the 1980 publication of the “big tree”, the first comprehensive tree of bacterial relationships. Fox also recognized the limitations that 16S rRNA sequences could provide when identifying closely related species and addressed the question of “How Close is Close?".

He became a full professor there in 1986. His current research centers around understanding the early evolution of life with particular interest in the origin and evolution of the ribosome. He has also assisted NASA scientists on multiple occasions in characterizing relevant microbial communities.

See also
 Three-domain system Towards a natural system of organisms: proposal for the domains Archaea, Bacteria, and Eucarya

Books describing discovery of Archaea
1. Quammen , D.(2018).“The Tangled Tree: A Radical New History of Life.”  Simon & Schuster . 
2. Sapp, J. (2009).“The New Foundations of Evolution,” Oxford University Press,.

References

External links

  Google Scholar Profile
  Google Scholar
  at the University of Houston, Houston, Texas
  BBC News
  The Space Show Broadcast
  Fellow in the International Society for the Study of the Origin of Life (ISSOL)
  Four Pioneering Scientists to Discuss “The Origins of the RNA World”
  The Library of Congress Astrobiology Chair Nathaniel Comfort Discusses the RNA World with Pioneering Scientists 
  Most important paper ever in microbiology? Woese & Fox, 1977, Discovery of Archaea
  Details of Ribosome Structure, Function and History Aaron Gronstal, 2020, NASA Astrobiology Exobiology Program, Center for the Origin of Life (COOL)

1945 births
Living people
Syracuse University alumni
Astrobiologists